The Deputy Prime Minister of Turkey is the abolished official deputy of the head of government of Turkey. Conventionally all of the junior partners in a coalition get one deputy, and they are ranked according to the size of their respective parties.

See also 
 Prime Minister of Turkey
 List of deputy prime ministers of Turkey
 Vice President of Turkey

Main